A Crude Awakening: The Oil Crash is a 2006 documentary film about peak oil, produced and directed by Basil Gelpke and Ray McCormack.

Overview
A Crude Awakening: The Oil Crash explores key historical events, data and predictions regarding the global peak in petroleum production through interviews with petroleum geologists, former OPEC officials, energy analysts, politicians, and political analysts. The film contains contemporary footage interspersed with news and commercial footage from the growth heyday of petroleum production. The documentary focuses on information and testimony that supports the projection of a near-term oil production peak.

The documentary examines our dependence on oil, showing how oil is essential for almost every aspect of our modern lifestyle, from driving to work to clothing to medicine and clean tap water.  A Crude Awakening asks the tough question, “What happens when we run out of cheap oil?” Through expert interviews and archival footage, the film spells out in startling detail the challenges we would face in dealing with the possibility of a world without cheap oil—a world in which it may ultimately take more energy to drill for oil than we can extract from the oil the wells produce.

Interviews
Interviews include energy investment banking CEO Matthew Simmons, petroleum geologist Dr. Colin Campbell, former OPEC Secretary-General Fadhil Chalabi, former U.S. Representative Roscoe Bartlett, among many others.

Findings
The interviewees provided the results of their analysis of current levels of proven reserves, the limited opportunities for significant oil discoveries, and the dire economic consequences of a global oil production peak. Their overall conclusions were that a global peak was imminent (if not already occurring), more wars would be fought to control access to oil resources, and economies most dependent on oil (or relying on trade with oil-dependent nations) would suffer dire consequences rivaling the Great Depression, without the benefit of cheap oil to enable a recovery.

References

External links
 
A Crude Awakening: The Oil Crash Lava Productions AG, film distributor

Documentary films about peak oil
Swiss documentary films
2006 films
2006 in the environment
2006 documentary films
2000s English-language films